Ahmed Mohamed El Sayed Moussa (born 13 October 1980) is an Egyptian retired professional footballer who played as a centre back.

Honours and achievements

Club
Al Ahly
 Egyptian Premier League: 2004–05, 2005–06, 2006–07, 2007–08, 2008–19, 2009–10, 2010–11
 Egypt Cup: 2001, 2003, 2006, 2007
 Egyptian Super Cup: 2003, 2005, 2006
 CAF Champions League: 2001, 2005, 2006 , 2008, 2012
 CAF Super Cup: 2002, 2006, 2007

International
Egypt
 Africa Cup of Nations: 2006

References

External links

1980 births
Living people
Egyptian footballers
Al Ahly SC players
Association football defenders
Egyptian Premier League players
Egypt international footballers
Misr Lel Makkasa SC players
Al Ittihad Alexandria Club
Telephonat Beni Suef SC players